The Glocester Town Pound is a historic animal pound on Pound Road and Chopmist Hill Road in Glocester, Rhode Island.

The stone pound was built in 1748 to confine stray livestock and is claimed by the town to be the oldest extant pound in America. It was added to the National Register of Historic Places in 1970.

See also
National Register of Historic Places listings in Providence County, Rhode Island

References

Agricultural buildings and structures on the National Register of Historic Places in Rhode Island
Infrastructure completed in 1748
Buildings and structures in Glocester, Rhode Island
National Register of Historic Places in Providence County, Rhode Island